The Castillet (or Castellet, small castle) is an ancient fortification and city gate located in Perpignan (Pyrénées-Orientales, France). Today, this monument, a strong symbol of the city, has become a museum: Museu Català de les Arts i Tradicions Populars (Catalan Museum of Popular Arts and Traditions).

The Castillet was made of three parts : the big Castillet, the small Castillet (former city gate), and a polygonal bastion. The bastion was destroyed in the early 20th century, but the big and small Castillet were saved from demolition.

References

Castillet
Monuments historiques of Pyrénées-Orientales